Holycross–Ballycahill GAA is a Tipperary GAA club which is located in County Tipperary, Ireland. Both hurling and Gaelic football are played in the "Mid-Tipperary" divisional competitions. The club that is centred on the villages of Holycross and Ballycahill and is located around five miles outside Thurles.

History
The club was founded in 1885. Holycross–Ballycahill GAA club compete in the Tipperary Senior Hurling Championship.

The period from 1947 to 1953 was the club's golden era. Four Mid Tipperary Senior Titles and three Senior County Tipperary titles in 1948, 1951 and 1954,  under the captaincy of Francis Maher.

A Mid Senior title was won in 1966, before the club reverted to the Junior ranks in 1971. A Junior County championship win in 1974, brought a revival to Holycross–Ballycahill GAA, which resulted in Mid Senior titles in 1978, 1985, 1989 and 1990.

The club added their fourth and most recent County Senior title in 1990 defeating Cashel King Cormacs. The team was led by Declan Carr who went on to lift the Liam MacCarthy Cup as Tipperary GAA captain 1991. They lifted All Ireland Junior B Hurling title in 2014 under the captaincy of Padraig McGrath, one of the club's finest achievements in recent years.

During Tipperary hurling's greatest years, Holycross-Ballycahill GAA club provided Pat Stakelum, who captained the 1949 All Ireland winning team. John Doyle won 8 All Ireland medals during this time with Tipperary, a record which he and Christy Ring held until 2011. Another Holycross-Ballycahill man, Phil Cahill, won All-Ireland medals in 1925 and 1930. Michael Maher collected 5 All-Ireland hurling medals with Tipperary during this time. Denis O'Gorman is one of few to hold All Ireland medals in Senior, Junior and Minor grades. Declan Carr won All Ireland medals in 1989 and 1991 (as captain), and also became the club's first All Star.

In 1979 Michael Doyle captained Tipperary to U21 Munster and All Ireland hurling titles. He subsequently went on to manage Tipperary to U21 Munster and All Ireland honours in 1995.

The club is located just outside the village of Holycross. In May 2011, a new multi-function complex was opened on the club's grounds, known as the John Doyle Centre. On the day of the new facilities opening, a tournament game was held between Tipperary and Waterford.

Since 2012, Holycross–Ballycahill GAA has hosted the Cut-Loose Country music festival on its grounds. Performances have included Nathan Carter, Mike Denver, Daniel O'Donnell, Lisa McHugh among others.

Honours

Mid Tipperary Championships:

 Mid Tipperary Hurling Championship: (12) 1947, 1948, 1951, 1954, 1966, 1978, 1985, 1989, 1990, 1991, 1997, 1999
 Mid Tipperary Intermediate Hurling Championship: (1) 1990
 Mid Tipperary Junior "A" Hurling Championship: (12) 1922 (as Holycross), 1941, 1974, 1980, 1988, 2006, 2007, 2008, 2016, 2017, 2020, 2021
 Mid Tipperary Junior "B" Hurling Championship: (4) 1975, 1992, 2012, 2013
 Mid Tipperary U21 "A" Hurling Championship: (8) 1963, 1977, 1978, 1983, 1993, 1996, 2017, 2019
 Mid Tipperary Under-21 B Hurling Championship: (1) 2006
 Mid Tipperary U19 "A" Hurling Championship: (1) 2022
 Mid Tipperary Under-19 B Hurling Championship: (1) 2021 
 Mid Tipperary Minor "A" Hurling Championship: (7) 1982, 1984, 1990, 1991, 2012, 2013, 2014
 Mid Tipperary Minor "B" Hurling Championship: (2) 2005, 2010
 Cahill Cup Hurling: (11) (Last in 2009)
 Mid Tipperary Intermediate Football Championship: (9) 1976, 1983, 1984, 1989, 2001, 2002, 2003, 2010, 2011
 Mid Tipperary Junior "A" Football Championship: (7) 1946, 1954, 1976, 1982, 1994, 1995, 2019
 Mid Tipperary U21 "A" Football Championship: (4) 1982, 1984, 1985, 1999
 Mid Tipperary U21 "B" Football Championship: (1) 2005
 Mid Tipperary Minor "A" Football Championship: (2) 1991, 1997
 Mid Tipperary Minor "B" Football Championship: (3) 1996, 2001, 2004

County Championships:

 Tipperary Senior Hurling Championship: (4) 1948, 1951, 1954, 1990 (Runners-Up 1964, 1989, 1991)
 Tipperary Junior A Hurling Championship: (4) 1941, 1974, 1988, 2010 
 Tipperary Junior "B" Hurling Championship: (1) 2013
 Tipperary Under-21 "A" Hurling Championship: (2) 1978, 1996
 Tipperary Under-19 "A" Hurling Championship: (1) 2022
 Tipperary Under-19 "B" Hurling Championship: (1) 2021
 Tipperary Minor "A" Hurling Championship: (2) 1982, 2022
 Tipperary Minor "B" Hurling Championship: (1) 2010
 Tipperary Junior "A" Football Championship: (2) 1982, 1995
 Tipperary Under-21 "A" Football Championship: (1) 1999
 Tipperary Under-21 "B" Football Championship: (1) 2005
 Tipperary Minor "B" Football Championship: (1) 1996

All-Ireland Championships:

 All-Ireland Junior B Club Hurling Championship: 1 (Last in 2014)

Notable players
 Cathal Barrett, 2014 All Stars Young Hurler of the Year
 Phil Cahill
 Declan Carr, Tipperary 1991 All Ireland Winning Captain 
 John Doyle
 Johnny Doyle
 Michael Doyle
 Tom Dwan
 Tim Gleeson
 Tony Lanigan
 Michael Maher
 Michael O'Dwyer
 Pat Stakelum, Tipperary 1949 All Ireland Winning Captain

All-Ireland Medal winners
Senior Hurling in Chronological Order
 Michael O'Dwyer: 1 (1908)
 Tom Dwan: 1 (1916, with Thurles)
 Joe Bannon: 2 (1924, 27, both with Dublin)
 Tom Barry: 2 (1924, 27, both with Dublin)
 Phil Cahill: 2 (1925, 1930)
 Denis O'Gorman: 1 (1937)
 John Doyle (hurler): 8 (1949, 50, 51, 58, 61, 62, 64, 65)
 Michael Maher: 5 (1958, 61, 62, 64, 65)
 Pat Stakelum: 3 (1949 as Captain, 50, 51)
 Ned O'Gorman: 1 (1949)
 Bob Stakelum: 1 (1949)
 Declan Carr: 2 (1989, 1991 as Captain)
 Cathal Barrett: 2 (2016, 2019)

References

External links
Tipperary GAA site
Official Holycross–Ballycahill GAA Club website
Tipperary GAA Archives (Holycross/ Ballycahill County Involvement)
Munster GAA Site
GAA Official Site

Hurling clubs in County Tipperary
Gaelic games clubs in County Tipperary
Holycross